The year 1694 in music involved some significant events.

Events
Musician Johannes Kelpius and his group of "mystics" arrive at the Wissahickon Creek in Philadelphia, Pennsylvania, bringing instruments that became an integral part of their church life.
The semi-opera The Rape of Europa by Jupiter, with music by John Eccles and text by Peter Anthony Motteux, is staged in London.

Classical music
Tomaso Albinoni – 12 Sonata a tre (Op. 1)
Dieterich Buxtehude – VII suonate, Op. 1 (date of publication unknown, but the print is listed in book fair catalogues of 1694)
Marc-Antoine Charpentier  
Messe de minuit pour Noël, H. 9
Prélude pour le Domine salvum, H. 535
Giovanni Paolo Colonna – Psalmi ad Vesperas, Op. 12
Arcangelo Corelli – 12 trio sonatas, Op. 4
Francisco Guerau – Poema Harmonico
Henry Purcell  
Te Deum and Jubilate Deo, Z. 232
Come, Ye Sons of Art Away, Z. 323
I Lov'd Fair Celia, Z. 381
Distressed Innocence, Z. 577
The Virtuous Wife, Z. 611
Music for the Funeral of Queen Mary for Mary II of England
 Alessandro Scarlatti – Correa nel seno amato, H. 146
 Antonio Veracini – 10 violin sonatas, Op. 2
Johann Paul von Westhoff – Sonate a Violino solo con basso continuo

Opera
Tomaso Albinoni – Zenobia, Regina de' Palmireni
Giovanni Bononcini – Xerse
Henri Desmarets – Circé
John Eccles – Macbeth
Francesco Gasparini – Il Roderico
Elisabeth Jacquet de la Guerre – Céphale et Procris
Johann Philipp Krieger – Hercules unter denen Amazonen
Alessandro Scarlatti – Pirro e Demetrio, premièred in Naples

Births
July 4 – Louis-Claude Daquin, composer (died 1772)
August 5 – Leonardo Leo, composer (died 1744)
September 5 – František Václav Míča, conductor and composer (died 1744)
date unknown – Pierre-Claude Foucquet, organist and harpsichordist (died 1772)

Deaths
March 11 – Jean-Nicolas Geoffroy, organist and harpsichordist (born 1633)
May 1 – Maria Elisabeth Lämmerhirt, wife of Johann Ambrosius Bach and mother of Johann Sebastian Bach (born 1644)
May 17 – Johann Michael Bach, composer, brother of Johann Christoph Bach (born 1648)
October 12 – Delphin Strungk, organist and composer (born 1600/1601)
December 20 – Erasmus Finx, hymn-writer (born 1627)
date unknown – René Ouvrard, writer and composer (born 1624)

References

 
17th century in music
Music by year